Frances Bagley (born April 7, 1946) is an American sculptor who was born in Fayetteville, Tennessee. Her sculptures are made from many different materials including metal, stone, human hair and fabric. Recently she has also included video into her art. She lives and works in Dallas,Texas.

Education 
Bagley initially went to the University of Tennessee with a scholarship for journalism. However, after taking an art course there, she says that she was "hooked" on art.

Bagley received a BFA in painting from Arizona State University (Tempe, Arizona) in 1969. Bagley realized that her paintings were really two-dimensional ideas about objects she wished to build. In 1971, she received an MA from Arizona State University and in 1980 an MFA in sculpture from the University of North Texas (Denton, Texas).

Career and art 
Bagley's sculptures are both abstract and figurative. She says, "My abstract figures attempt to speak of the human spirit as an icon of human experience, although frozen outside time." The Portrait, made of unpolished marble, evokes classical sculpture with a modern, abstract sensibility. Bagley cites artists Louise Bourgeois and Francis Bacon as two of her favorite artistic inspirations.

In 2008, Bagley was the first American to win an award from the Kajima Sculpture Exhibition held biannually in Tokyo.

Bagley has also created public sculpture and art projects. In 2015, a 14-year-old public art created with in collaboration with Tom Orr and located at  White Rock Lake in Dallas was recently the cause of controversy when the city of Dallas determined that it did not have the funds available to restore the art and that it must be demolished. A compromise was reached: Dallas will commission another work from Bagley and Orr.

Another collaborative project that Bagley and Orr worked on was the creation of sets and costumes for the Dallas Opera's 50th Anniversary and performance of Verdi's Nabucco. The design and creation of the sets and costumes took more than a year to complete.

The Arkansas Arts Center (Little Rock, AR), the City of Dallas,Texas, Del Mar College (Corpus Christi, TX), the El Paso Museum of Art, the National Museum of Women in the Arts and the University of Texas at Arlington are among the public collections holding work by Frances Bagley. Many corporate entities also collect her art.

Further reading 
 Glueck, Grace, Guide to What's New in Outdoor Sculpture, The New York Times, Friday, September 12, 1980, C1, C20.
 Kutner, Janet, The Southwest Texas Ranges: Dallas, Acquisitions Are Only Part of the Action, Art News, vol. 81, no. 10, December 1982, 86-88.
 McFadden, Sarah, Going Places, Part II. The Outside Story, Creedmoor Psychiatric Center Art in America, vol. 68, no. 6, Summer 1980, 51-55, 57-59, 61.
 Taylor, Elmer, An Apprenticeship in England, Ceramics Monthly, vol 21, no. 1, January 1973, 28-29.
 Watson-Jones, Virginia, Contemporary American Women Sculptors, Phoenix, Oryx Press, 1986, 32.

External links

References

American women sculptors
Modern sculptors
Living people
1946 births
People from Fayetteville, Tennessee
Arizona State University alumni
University of North Texas alumni
Artists from Dallas
21st-century American women artists